Gullspång is a locality and one of two seats of the Gullspång Municipality in Västra Götaland County, Sweden. As of 2010 it had 1,167 inhabitants.

History
Gullspång provided the name for a new municipality created through the local government reform of 1971, but the administration was placed in the more centrally located Hova, with just some minor offices in Gullspång.

Due to the long lasting rivalry between Gullspång and Hova the municipality avoids the term centralort (seat). Instead they are called the municipality's two main localities.

Business 
A major employer found in Gullspång is Partex Marking Systems, a company that manufactures markers for cables.

In Gullspång, Fortum also has a hydroelectric power using the water from the Skagern river to produce electricity. Fortum is quite a large employer in the town of Gullspång.

Vänerhamn AB, which has cargo ports around the entire Vänern, is a port of Otterbäcken. The port transports several million tonnes of freight each year.

Culture 
From 1939-1954 author Frans G. Bengtsson lived in Ribbingsfors Mansion, just outside Gullspång. There he wrote many of his famous works and left behind many books, writings, and notes which are now located in a designated area of the municipal library.

Linda Bengtzing, a famous Swedish singer who was born and raised in Gullspång, found success with the 2005 song "alla flickor" after it was entered in the Swedish Song Contest. She has participated in the Swedish Song Contest twice after "alla flickor" and has competed with a choir from Gullspång in the high-profile contest Clash of the Choirs (2008).

Lina Bengtsdotter, author of the successful crime fiction novel series featuring inspector Charlie Lager, was born and raised in Gullspång, where her stories are also set.

Salmon 
In central Gullspång is a salmon-stair which was built in 2004. It was built to increase the population of the local Gullspång salmon ("Gullspångslax"). The salmon-stair was made possible by the installation of flood gates which filled the dry area with water from the Gullspångsälven river.

References 

Municipal seats of Västra Götaland County
Swedish municipal seats
Populated places in Västra Götaland County
Populated places in Gullspång Municipality